This is a list of Cornish people and others resident in Cornwall, England, United Kingdom, who are known for their historical writings. Many of them have written almost exclusively about Cornwall.

Historians and scholars

See also

 Historiography of the United Kingdom

References

 
Historians of England
Historians